ReCOV is a COVID-19 vaccine candidate developed by Jiangsu Rec-Biotechnology Co Ltd.

References 

Clinical trials
Chinese COVID-19 vaccines
Protein subunit vaccines